Makhoarane is a community council located in the Maseru District of Lesotho. Its population in 2006 was 26,674.

Villages
The community of Makhoarane includes the villages of: 
 
 Aupolasi
 Bethane (Kholokoe)
 Boreipala
 Fuleng
 Ha Batere
 Ha Bolese
 Ha Folene
 Ha Jobo
 Ha Khoahla
 Ha Khulomi
 Ha Lekhooa
 Ha Lepipi
 Ha Leutsoa
 Ha Likhama
 Ha Mafa
 Ha Mafafa
 Ha Makhabane
 Ha Makhetha
 Ha Malingoana
 Ha Maphathe
 Ha Matela
 Ha Mofumotse
 Ha Mohloanyane
 Ha Moima
 Ha Moitheri
 Ha Mojela
 Ha Molahlehi
 Ha Moorosi
 Ha Moremi
 Ha Moruthoane
 Ha Mpesela
 Ha Mphethi
 Ha Nkaka
 Ha Nkofi
 Ha Ntele
 Ha Paanya
 Ha Palama
 Ha Petje
 Ha Phalole
 Ha Ramabele
 Ha Ramakhunong
 Ha Raphoka
 Ha Ratsilonyane
 Ha Robose (Mokubata)
 Ha Sanaha
 Ha Santi
 Ha Sebete
 Ha Seelane
 Ha Sehlahla
 Ha Sehlokohlo
 Ha Sekhobe
 Ha Sekoai
 Ha Sekoala
 Ha Setala
 Ha Setipe
 Ha Sola
 Ha Sonti
 Ha Soothi
 Ha Taele
 Ha Taka
 Ha Thabo
 Ha Thite
 Ha Toka
 Ha Toloane
 Ha Tšehlo
 Ha Tšepe
 Ha Tšilo
 Ha Tšilonyane
 Ha Tšoene
 Ha Tumaki
 Kanana
 Kerekeng
 Kholokoe
 Lefikaneng
 Letlapeng
 Likhoiting
 Lithotseleng
 Mabenkeleng
 Maetheng
 Mafikeng
 Makeneng
 Makhonofane
 Makoabating
 Malekhalana
 Maloaleng
 Mantsaneng
 Mapoleseng
 Matsieng
 Mauteng (Masojaneng)
 Mauteng (Matebeleng)
 Mekateng
 Mohlominyane
 Moreneng
 Morija
 Moshoeshoe II
 Musa-Pelo
 Oporolo
 Phahameng
 Salisi
 Terai Hoek
 Thabong
 Thotaneng
 Tlokoeng
 Tsitsa and Vukazensele

References

External links
 Google map of community villages

Populated places in Maseru District